Milton Howard Pettit (October 22, 1835 – March 23, 1873) was an American businessman,  Republican politician, and Wisconsin pioneer.  He was the 11th lieutenant governor of Wisconsin, during the governorship of Cadwallader C. Washburn, and died while in office.  Earlier, he had been mayor of Kenosha, Wisconsin, and had represented Kenosha in the Wisconsin State Senate.

Biography

He was born in Fabius, New York, in 1835, but moved to Somers, Wisconsin Territory, at the age of 11.  As an adult, in 1854, he moved to the neighboring city of Kenosha, Wisconsin, and became a member of the Republican Party.  In 1859 he was elected to the city council and, in 1861, he was elected to his first term as Mayor of Kenosha.  He would be elected to three more one-year terms as Mayor, in 1865, 1867, and 1870, and was elected to represent Kenosha County in the Wisconsin State Senate for the 1870 and 1871 sessions of the Wisconsin Legislature.  In 1871, he was the Republican nominee for Lieutenant Governor, and won election, along with Republican gubernatorial nominee Cadwallader Washburn.  Shortly after taking office in 1872, however, his health began to fail, and he died in the spring of 1873.  He was the second Lieutenant Governor of Wisconsin to die in office, after Timothy Burns.

Electoral history

Wisconsin Senate (1869)

| colspan="6" style="text-align:center;background-color: #e9e9e9;"| General Election, November 2, 1869

Wisconsin Lieutenant Governor (1871)

| colspan="6" style="text-align:center;background-color: #e9e9e9;"| General Election, November 7, 1871

References 

1835 births
1873 deaths
Republican Party Wisconsin state senators
Mayors of Kenosha, Wisconsin
Wisconsin city council members
People from Fabius, New York
19th-century American politicians
People from Somers, Wisconsin